Stankica Atanasova (born 13 September 1994) is a Macedonian footballer who plays as a defender for the North Macedonia national team.

International career
Atanasova made her debut for the North Macedonia national team on 21 August 2014, coming on as a substitute for Ana Veselinova against Romania.

References

1994 births
Living people
Women's association football defenders
Macedonian women's footballers
North Macedonia women's international footballers